Personal Reminiscences of Henry Irving is the third book of non-fiction by Bram Stoker (the author of Dracula), published in 1906. It is a biography about the English actor Henry Irving.

References

External links
BramStoker.org Full PDF version of Personal Reminiscences of Henry Irving.

1906 non-fiction books
Biographies about actors
British biographies
Heinemann (publisher) books
Works by Bram Stoker